Myrna Driedger (born 1952) is a politician in Manitoba, Canada.  She is a member of the Legislative Assembly of Manitoba.

Early life
She was born in Benito, Manitoba, and was educated at Benito Collegiate, at the Winnipeg General Hospital School of Nursing and at Red River Community College. Before entering provincial politics, Driedger worked as a nurse for 23 years.  She served as CEO of Child Find Manitoba, and was Co-Chair of the province's Abuse Prevention Services Adult Advisory Committee.  She has also participated in other groups which provide services to poor and vulnerable children.  At one stage, she was Manitoba President of the Canadian Association of Neurological and Neurosurgical Nurses. She is married to Helmut Driedger.

Politics
Driedger was elected to the provincial legislature in a 1998 by-election, in the upscale west Winnipeg riding of Charleswood.  A Progressive Conservative, Driedger defeated Liberal candidate Alan McKenzie by 2767 votes to 1524.  She was subsequently named legislative assistant to the Minister of Family Services and the Minister of Health.

The Progressive Conservative government of Gary Filmon was defeated in the 1999 provincial election, although Driedger was re-elected in Charleswood by an increased margin.  She was again re-elected in the 2003 election, defeating her leading opponent by over one thousand votes.  Although the governing New Democratic Party made significant inroads in south-end Winnipeg in 2003, they were unable to do better than a third-place finish in Driedger's riding, due in part to the popularity of Manitoba Liberal Party candidate Rick Ross.

Driedger has participated in a panel seeking input on possible reforms to the province's Young Offenders Act, and has also participated in programs for aboriginal children.  In 2001, she visited France and Switzerland on a fact-finding mission concerning the health-care policies of these countries.  In 2003, she advocated the establishment of a Manitoba Heart Institute to reduce waiting list times.  She supports Medicare, but has also called for the introduction of further private health services to the province.

She campaigned for Conservative Party of Canada candidate Steven Fletcher in the federal election of 2004.

She was re-elected in the 2007, 2011, 2016 and 2019 provincial elections.

References

External links
 http://www.myrnadriedger.com/
Candidacy announcement for the 2016 Manitoba general election

1952 births
21st-century Canadian politicians
21st-century Canadian women politicians
Canadian nurses
Canadian women nurses
Canadian people of German descent
Living people
People from Parkland Region, Manitoba
Politicians from Winnipeg
Progressive Conservative Party of Manitoba MLAs
Red River College alumni
Speakers of the Legislative Assembly of Manitoba
Women legislative speakers
Women MLAs in Manitoba